The North Carolina Central Eagles men's basketball team is the basketball team that represents North Carolina Central University, which is located in Durham, North Carolina, United States. The team currently competes in the Mid-Eastern Athletic Conference.

Prior to 2011, the Eagles competed in NCAA Division II and won the 1989 NCAA Men's Division II Basketball Championship. For much of the university's tenure in Division II, the school (formerly "North Carolina College") was a member of the Central Intercollegiate Athletic Association.

Eagles in the NBA

NBA & ABA players who attended North Carolina Central:

 Lee Davis - Selected in the 10th round by the Phoenix Suns in the 1968 NBA draft.
 Sam Jones - Selected 8th overall by the Boston Celtics in the 1957 NBA draft.
 David Young - Selected in the 2nd round by the Seattle SuperSonics in the 2004 NBA draft.

Eagles in international basketball

Stanton Kidd (born 1992), basketball player for Hapoel Jerusalem in  the Israeli Basketball Premier League

Eagles in the Hall of Fame

Two Eagles have been selected to the Naismith Memorial Basketball Hall of Fame:
 Sam Jones - former NCCU player - inducted as a player in 1984.
 John McClendon - former NCCU coach - inducted as a "contributor" in 1979, and as a coach in 2016.

Postseason

NCAA Division I tournament results
The Eagles have appeared in the NCAA Division I Tournament four times. Their combined record is 0–4.

NIT results
The Eagles have appeared in the National Invitation Tournament (NIT) one time. Their record is 0–1.

NCAA Division II tournament results
The Eagles have appeared in the NCAA Division II Tournament seven times. Their combined record is 10–6. They were Division II National Champions in 1989.

References

External links